The 2003 DFS Classic was a women's tennis tournament played on grass courts at the Edgbaston Priory Club in Birmingham in the United Kingdom that was part of Tier III of the 2003 WTA Tour. It was the 22nd edition of the tournament and was held from 9 June until 15 June 2003. Third-seeded Magdalena Maleeva won the singles title.

Finals

Singles

 Magdalena Maleeva defeated  Shinobu Asagoe 6–1, 6–4
 It was Maleeva's 2nd title of the year and the 14th of her career.

Doubles

 Els Callens /  Meilen Tu defeated  Alicia Molik /  Martina Navratilova 7–5, 6–4
 It was Callens' only title of the year and the 8th of her career. It was Tu's only title of the year and the 4th of her career.

External links
 ITF tournament edition details

DFS Classic
Birmingham Classic (tennis)
DFS Classic
DFS Classic